Aleksandr Zarubin ( Aleksandr Zarubin) was a Russian politician, statesman, and diplomat.

There is a little or no information of Zarubin. He was a secretary (minister) of the Ukrainian government, however he held a position that was assigned to the Russian minority representative. That was by the request of the Russian Provisional Government that demanded to have several members of Russian political background. Later, after the dismissal of the first government and its reorganization in the next government, Zarubin held two positions. Since July and until the end of fall, he served as the state controller, beside his secretarial assignment as the secretary of Post and Telegraph services. Zarubin also was elected to the delegation together with Volodymyr Vynnychenko and Ivan Steshenko that was scheduled to meet with the government of Alexander Kerensky on October 21, which was accusing the Vynnychenko's government in separatism. Later, that meeting was canceled due to the Bolshevik coup-d'etat. Zarubin's further fate is unknown.

Sources
 Encyclopedia of Ukrainian Studies (in 10 volumes), editor Volodymyr Kubiyovych. "Molode Zhyttia" Paris, New-York; 1954—1989.
 Minor dictionary of history of Ukraine, editor Valeriy Smoliy. — "Lybid", Kyiv; 1997.

External links
 List of SR party members, the site claims him to be affiliated with the Ukrainian SR, however the position that he served was assigned to the Russian politicians therefore he could not have been affiliated with the Ukrainian SR.
 Internet version of the Encyclopedia of Ukrainian Studies 

People from Kiev Governorate
Ukrainian politicians before 1991
Socialist Revolutionary Party politicians
Year of death uncertain
State controllers of Ukraine
Communications ministers of Ukraine
Members of the Central Council of Ukraine